Antonio Pérez may refer to:
 Antonio Pérez (statesman) (1540–1611), Spanish statesman, secretary of king Philip II of Spain
 Antonio Pérez (baseball) (born 1980), retired Major League Baseball player
 Antonio Pérez (swimmer) (born 1944), Spanish Olympic swimmer
 Antonio Pérez (volleyball) (born 1956), Cuban volleyball player
 Antonio M. Pérez (born 1947), businessman from Spain, CEO of Eastman Kodak Company
 Antonio Pérez Yuste (born 1968), professor of telecommunications engineering
 Antonio Pérez Delgadillo (born 1978), Mexican footballer
 Antonio Pérez (educator) (born 1946), New York City educator
 Antonio Pérez (archbishop) (1562–1637), Roman Catholic prelate
 Antonio Pérez (racing driver) (born 1986), Mexican racing driver